Titanium metals may mean:

 Titanium, chemical element, atomic number 22
 Titanium alloy, metallic material used most notably in aircraft production
 Titanium Metals Corporation